Keepgo is a global telecom company for the eSIM age.

The company provides cellular data-only connectivity worldwide to consumers and Connectivity as a Service (CaaS) for business customers.

Since the first eSIM patent in 2017, Keepgo has developed the platform, IP and know-how to sell eSIM plans to consumers and enable companies to offer eSIM to their user base.

Keepgo supports 100% of broadband consumer devices: eSIM-enabled, pSIM-only and locked devices (through their mobile hotspot) with the highest privacy standards for customers. Privacy is ensured through a zero personal data system.

History

In 2011, Keepgo was founded by David Lipovkov and Guy Zbarsky. Guy Zbarsky left the company in 2018.

In 2015, Keepgo expanded its services to provide international travelers with the convenience of having a reliable internet connection abroad.

In 2017, after several years of development, Keepgo patented the EzFi Virtual Sim technology (compatible with GSMA eSIM).

In 2018, Keepgo developed white label service to enable companies to add global cellular connectivity to their products. Keepgo service utilizes pSIM (physical SIM card).

In 2020, Keepgo developed eSIM product for its customers.

In 2022, Keepgo added eSIM to its white label service to enable companies to add eSIM data-only connectivity to their products.

Services

Keepgo services include cellular connectivity for consumers and white label cellular connectivity service for companies. Keepgo's clients have access to 300+ cellular networks in 100+ countries, thanks to Keepgo's extensive portfolio of MVNO and partner agreements and integrations with multiple telco operators around the world.

References

External links 

 Official site

Telecommunications companies of the United States